Killer Bees! is an action video game written by Robert S. Harris for the Magnavox Odyssey2 and published in 1983.

Reception
Art Levis for Electronic Fun with Computers & Games said "Here's a game that has great play value, doesn't involve the shopworn space or maze cliches, is graphically vivid and has great sound effects – yet only an eccentric handful of games players will ever know its joysticks".

Reviews
TeleMatch - Dec, 1983
Tilt - Sep, 1983
Games

References

External links
 "Bob Harris And The Secret Of The Killer Bees", Dieter Koenig, archived at dieterkoenig.at, retrieved 2010-2-22
The Vid Kid's Book of Home Video Games
Review in Videogaming and Computer Gaming Illustrated
Odyssey 2 Adventure - Volume 2 Issue 2
in Electronic Games

1983 video games
Magnavox Odyssey 2 games
Shoot 'em ups
Video games about insects
Video games developed in the United States